Pasaccardoa is a genus of African plants in the gerbera tribe within the sunflower family.

The genus is native to Angola, Tanzania, Zambia and Zaïre.<ref name="Powo">{{cite web |title='Pasaccardoa Kuntze  Plants of the World Online  Kew Science |url=https://powo.science.kew.org/taxon/urn:lsid:ipni.org:names:10405-1 |website=Plants of the World Online |access-date=8 October 2022 |language=en}}</ref>

The genus was circumscribed by Carl Ernst Otto Kuntze in Revis. Gen. Pl. vol.1 on page 354 in 1891.

The genus name of Pasaccardoa is in honour of Pier Andrea Saccardo (1845–1920), who was an Italian botanist and mycologist.

 Species
 Pasaccardoa baumii O.Hoffm. 
 Pasaccardoa grantii (Benth. ex Oliv.) Kuntze 
 Pasaccardoa jeffreyi Wild
 Pasaccardoa procumbens'' (Lisowski) G.V.Pope

References

Mutisieae
Asteraceae genera
Flora of Tanzania
Flora of Angola
Flora of Zambia
Flora of the Democratic Republic of the Congo (formerly Zaire)